Psaliodes is a genus of moths in the family Geometridae. The genus was erected by Achille Guenée in 1857.

Species

References

Larentiinae
Geometridae genera